The 1971 Ice Hockey World Championships was the 38th edition of the Ice Hockey World Championships, which also doubled as the 49th European ice hockey championships.
The Pool A, Pool B and Pool C tournaments were hosted by the following nations:

Pool A in Switzerland (Bern and Geneva), 19 March – 3 April 1971
Pool B in Switzerland (Bern, Geneva, La Chaux-de-Fonds and Lyss), 5–14 March 1971
Pool C in the Netherlands, 26 February – 7 March 1971

A record 22 nations participated in the tournaments. The Pool A tournament featured the top six nations, playing a double round-robin tournament for the World Championship. Teams #7-#14 participated in the Pool B tournament with the winner qualifying for the 1972 Pool A championship while the two last-place teams were demoted to the 1972 Pool C tournament. The bottom eight teams participated in the Pool C tournament with the top two teams qualifying for the 1972 Pool B tournament.

The Soviet Union won its ninth consecutive (a record which has not been broken), and 11th overall, title.

This was the last international tournament in which goaltenders did not have to wear face masks.

Qualifying round (A/B)

The Pool A tournament was held in Bern and Geneva, Switzerland, from 19 March to 3 April 1971. The East German team declined to participate. West Germany participated instead after beating Poland in two qualifying games arranged in November 1970 for the vacant slot.  West Germany had placed second in last year's Pool B, while Poland had finished 6th in last year's Pool A.

 –  6:3 (2:0, 3:2, 1:1)

8 November 1970 – Munich

 –  4:4 (2:0, 2:0, 0:4)

12 November 1970 – Łódź

World Championship Group A (Switzerland)

For the ninth straight year, the Soviet Union won the world championship, although Czechoslovakia won the 49th European championship as the Czech opening loss against the Americans did not count in the European standings. Team USA was demoted to the 1972 Pool B tournament.  The Americans came into their final game needing to win by five goals, and led five to zero in the third period, but the Germans scored the only goal of the frame claiming the advantage in the tie-breaker for 5th place.

 – 	1:5 (1:3, 0:1, 0:1)

19 March 1971 – Bern
Goalscorers: Nedomanský – Riutta 2, Konik, Patrick, Boucha.
Referees: Dahlberg (SWE), Ehrensperger (SUI)

 –  11:2 (2:2, 3:0, 6:0)

19 March 1971 – Bern
Goalscorers: Mišakov 3, Petrov 2, Vikulov 2, Firsov, Malcev, Zimin, Martiňuk – Alois Schloder, Philipp.

 –  2:4 (1:1, 1:1, 0:2)

20 March 1971 – Bern
Goalscorers: Boucha, Falkman – Wickberg 2, Sterner, Lindberg

 –  3:4 (1:2, 1:1, 1:1)

20 March 1971 – Bern
Goalscorers: Hanig, Kuhn, Philipp – Oksanen 2, Ketola, Isaksson.

 – 	5:6 (1:2, 2:0, 2:4)

21 March 1971 – Bern
Goalscorers: Hlinka 3, Nedomanský, Panchártek – Lundström 2, Hammarström, Nilsson, Norlander, Sterner.
Referees: Bader (GER), Ehrensperger (SUI)

 –  1:8 (1:1, 0:2, 0:5)

21 March 1971 – Bern
Goalscorers: Koskela – Malcev 2, Petrov 2, Davydov, Vikulov, Firsov, Michajlov.

 –  	9:1 (1:0, 3:1, 5:0)

22 March 1971 – Bern
Goalscorers: B. Šťastný 2, Kochta, Farda, Černý, Martinec, Horešovský, Jiří Holík, Pospíšil – Eimansberger.
Referees: Gagnon (USA), Sillankorva (FIN)

 –  10:2 (1:0, 7:1, 2:1)

22 March 1971 – Bern
Goalscorers: Vikulov 2, Staršinov 2, Mišakov 2, Lutčenko, Firsov, Malcev, Charlamov – Sheehy, Christiansen.

 –  2:7 (0:3, 1:2, 1:2)

23 March 1971 – Bern
Goalscorers: Alois Schloder, Philipp – Nordlander, Abrahamsson, Wickberg, Lundström, Lindberg, Stig-Göran Johansson, Hammarchtröm.

 –  4:7 (0:2, 3:3, 1:2)

23 March 1971 – Bern
Goalscorers: Gambucci 2, McElmury, Patrick – Marjamäki, Esa Peltonen, Vehmanen, Linnonmaa, Lindström, Oksanen, Koskela.

 –  1:1 (1:0, 0:0, 0:1)

24 March 1971 – Bern
Goalscorers: Ketola – Nordlander.

 –  	3:3 (1:1, 1:1, 1:1)

24 March 1971 – Bern
Goalscorers: Novák, Nedomanský, Kochta – Martyňuk, Firsov, Petrov.
Referees: Wycsik (POL), Ehrensperger (SUI)

 –  2:7 (0:2, 1:3, 1:2)

25 March 1971 – Bern
Goalscorers: Christiansen, Boucha – Hofherr 2, Philipp 2, Völk, Hanig, Kuhn.

 –  0:8 (0:4, 0:1, 0:3)

26 March 1971 – Bern
Goalscorers: Firsov 4, Michajlov 2, Petrov, Martiňuk.

 –  	5:0 (0:0, 3:0, 2:0)

26 March 1971 – Bern
Goalscorers: Farda, Novák, Nedomanský, Kochta, Jiří Holík.
Referees: Bader (GER), Dämmerich (GDR)

 –  	5:0 (0:0, 3:0, 2:0)

27 March 1971 – Geneva
Goalscorers: Černý, Pospíšil, Bubla, Novák, Farda.
Referees: Karandin (URS), Gerber (SUI)

 –  2:12 (1:1, 0:7, 1:4)

27 March 1971 – Geneva
Goalscorers: Alois Schloder, Modes – Lutčenko, Vikulov, Malcev 2, Firsov, Charlamov 2, Michajlov, Zimin, Šadrin 3.

 –  4:3 (1:0, 1:3, 2:0)

28 March 1971 – Geneva
Goalscorers: Lundström 2, Nilsson, Palmqvist – Gambucci 2, Boucha.

 –  7:2 (3:0, 0:1, 4:1)

28 March 1971 – Geneva
Goalscorers: Repo, Järn, Erkki Mononen, Murto, Lauri Mononen, Marjamäki, Vehmanen – Bernd Kuhn, Egger.

 –  10:1 (5:1, 1:0, 4:0)

29 March 1971 – Geneva
Goalscorers: Malcev 2, Michajlov, Petrov, Martiňuk, Staršinov, Ragulin, Firsov, Šadrin 2 – Koskela.

 –  	3:1 (1:0, 1:0, 1:1)

29 March 1971 – Geneva
Goalscorers: Černý, Suchý, Kochta – Bergman.
Referees: Karandin (URS), Ehrenberger (SUI)

 – 	4:0 (1:0, 1:0, 2:0)

30 March 1971 – Geneva
Goalscorers: Černý 2, Nedomanský, Martinec.
Referees: Sillankorva (FIN), Gerber (SUI)

 –  5:7 (1:1, 2:5, 2:1)

30 March 1971 – Geneva
Goalscorers: Gambucci 2, Christiansen, Mellor, Boucha – Romiševskij, Malcev, Kuzkin, Michajlov, Martiňuk, Šadrin, Mišakov.

 –  1:2 (1:0, 0:2, 0:0)

31 March 1971 – Geneva
Goalscorers: Palmqvist – Schneitberger, Hanig.

 –  7:3 (1:1, 3:1, 3:1)

31 March 1971 – Geneva
Goalscorers: Ketola 3, Koskela 2, Luojola, Oksanen – D.Ross, McElmury, Boucha.

 –  2:1 (0:0, 2:0, 0:1)

1 April 1971 – Geneva
Goalscorers: Svedberg, Pettersson – Koskela.

 –  	5:2 (1:1, 1:1, 3:0)

1 April 1971 – Geneva
Goalscorers: Nedomanský, Suchý, Horešovský, B. Šťastný, Farda – Malcev, Charlamov.
Referees: Wycisk (POL), Ehrensperger (SUI)

 –  1:5 (0:1, 0:4, 1:0)

2 April 1971 – Geneva
Goalscorers: Hofherr – Gambucci, Patrick, Boucha, Ahearn, Christiansen.

 –  	4:2 (2:1, 1:1, 1:0)

3 April 1971 – Geneva
Goalscorers: Nedomanský 2, B. Šťastný, Hlinka – Murto, Linnonmaa.
Referees: Wycisk (POL), Ehrensperger (SUI)

 –  6:3 (2:1, 0:2, 4:0)

3 April 1971 – Geneva
Goalscorers: Firsov, Petrov, Michajlov, Lutčenko, Charlamov, Kuzkin – Håkan Wickberg, Tord Lundström, Håkan Pettersson.

Pool A statistics and team rosters

1. 
Goalkeepers: Viktor Konovalenko, Vladislav Tretiak.
Defencemen: Vladimir Lutchenko, Alexander Ragulin, Vitali Davydov, Viktor Kuzkin, Igor Romishevsky, Yuri Lyapkin, Gennadiy Tsygankov.
Forwards: Boris Mikhailov, Vladimir Petrov, Valeri Kharlamov, Vladimir Vikulov, Alexander Maltsev, Anatoli Firsov, Alexander Martynyuk, Yevgeni Mishakov, Vyacheslav Starshinov, Vladimir Shadrin, Yevgeni Zimin.
Coaches: Arkady Chernyshev, Anatoly Tarasov.

2. 
Goalkeepers: Jiří Holeček, Marcel Sakač.
Defencemen: Jan Suchý, František Pospíšil, Oldřich Machač, František Panchártek, Josef Horešovský, Rudolf Tajcnár, Jiří Bubla.
Forwards: Jan Havel, Václav Nedomanský, Jiří Holík, Eduard Novák, Richard Farda, Josef Černý, Vladimír Martinec, Ivan Hlinka, Bohuslav Šťastný, Jiří Kochta, Bedřich Brunclík.
Coaches: Jaroslav Pitner, Vladimír Kostka.

3. 
Goalkeepers: Christer Abrahamsson, Leif Holmqvist, William Löfqvist.
Defencemen: Arne Carlsson, Lennart Svedberg, Thommy Abrahamsson, Bert-Ola Nordlander, Thommie Bergman, Kjell-Rune Milton, .
Forwards: Inge Hammarström, Stig-Göran Johansson, Hans Lindberg, Tord Lundström, Lars-Göran Nilsson, Håkan Nygren, Björn Palmqvist, Håkan Pettersson, Ulf Sterner, Håkan Wickberg.
Coach: Arne Strömberg.

4. 
Goalkeepers: Urpo Ylönen, Jorma Valtonen.
Defencemen: Ilpo Koskela, Seppo Lindström, Hannu Luojola, Heikki Järn, Pekka Marjamäki, Jauko Öystilä.
Forwards: Lauri Mononen, Erkki Mononen, Seppo Repo, Esa Isaksson, Jorma Vehmanen, Lasse Oksanen, Tommi Salmelainen, Veli-Pekka Ketola, Harri Linnonmaa, Matti Murto, Esa Peltonen, Juhani Tamminen.
Coaches: Seppo Liitsola, Matias Helenius.

5. 
Goalkeepers: Anton Kehle, Josef Schramm.
Defencemen: Hans Schichti, Rudolf Thanner, Josef Völk, Paul Langer, Otto Schneidberger, Erwin Riedmeier, Werner Modes.
Forwards: Alois Schloder, Gustav Hanig, Bernd Kuhn, Anton Hofherr, Rainer Phillip, Lorenz Funk, Johann Eimannsberger, Franz Hofherr, Karl-Heinz Egger, Heinz Weisenbach, Klaus Ego.
Coach: Gerhard Kiessling.

6. 
Goalkeepers: Carl Wetzel, Mike Curran, Dick Tomasoni.
Defencemen: George Konik, Jim McElmury, Don Ross, Bruce Riutta, Tom Mellor, Dick McGlynn.
Forwards: Henry Boucha, Gary Gambucci, Craig Patrick, Craig Falkman, Keith Christiansen, Tim Sheehy, Leonard Lilyholm, Kevin Ahearn, Bob Lindberg, Paul Schilling, Pete Fichuk, Richard Toomey.
Coach: Murray Williamson.

World Championship Group B (Switzerland)

 Switzerland qualify for 1972 Pool A championship tournament; Austria and Italy demoted to 1972 Pool C tournament.  Additionally, the top six qualify for the Sapporo Olympics.

 –  6:3 (2:0, 2:1, 2:2)

5 March 1971 – Bern

 –  6:2 (2:0, 2:1, 2:1)

5 March 1971 – Bern

 –  9:4 (0:1, 4:1, 5:2)

5 March 1971 – Bern

 –  4:1 (2:0, 1:0, 1:1)

5 March 1971 – Lyss

 –  3:1 (2:0, 1:1, 0:0)

6 March 1971 – Bern

 –  4:4 (1:0, 0:2, 3:2)

6 March 1971 – Bern

 –  3:2 (0:1, 2:0, 1:1)

6 March 1971 – Lyss

 –  7:4 (3:0, 1:4, 3:0)

7 March 1971 – Bern

 –  7:2 (2:1, 3:1, 2:0)

8 March 1971 – Bern

  –  6:2 (2:0, 2:0, 2:2)

8 March 1971 – Geneva

 –  5:3 (2:1, 1:1, 2:1)

8 March 1971 – Bern

 –  4:4 (2:0, 1:3, 1:1)

8 March 1971 – La Chaux-de-Fonds

 –  11:0 (5:0, 1:0, 5:0)

9 March 1971 – Bern

 –  7:2 (1:0, 5:0, 1:2)

9 March 1971 – Geneva

 –  8:5 (0:1, 3:2, 5:2)

9 March 1971 – La Chaux-de-Fonds

  –  6:4 (2:0, 1:2, 3:2)

10 March 1971 – Lyss

 –  11:3 (3:1, 5:1, 3:1)

11 March 1971 – Lyss

 –  4:4 (2:2, 1:1, 1:1)

11 March 1971 – Bern

 –  8:1 (0:0, 5:0, 3:1)

11 March 1971 – Bern

 –  4:1 (1:0, 3:0, 0:1)

11 March 1971 – La Chaux-de-Fonds

 –  10:6 (5:1, 0:3, 5:2)

13 March 1971 – La Chaux-de-Fonds

 –  4:0 (1:0, 0:0, 3:0)

13 March 1971 – Bern

 –  6:0 (1:0, 1:0, 4:0)

13 March 1971 – Geneva

 –  3:1 (2:0, 0:1, 1:0)

13 March 1971 – Bern

 –  7:6 (1:2, 5:0, 1:4)

14 March 1971 – Bern

 –  3:2 (0:0, 2:0, 1:2)

14 March 1971 – Geneva

 –  8:4 (1:0, 4:2, 3:2)

14 March 1971 – La Chaux-de-Fonds

 –  5:0 (2:0, 2:0, 1:0)

14 March 1971 – Lyss

World Championship Group C (Netherlands)

 Romania and France qualify for 1972 Pool B tournament, and the Sapporo Olympics.

 –  7:6 (1:0, 4:2, 2:4)

26. February 1971 – Nijmegen

 –  1:7 (0:0, 1:2, 0:5)

26. February 1971 – Utrecht

 –  18:2 (8:0, 4:0, 6:2)

26. February 1971 – Eindhoven

 –  3:1 (2:0, 0:0, 1:1)

26. February 1971 – Tilburg

 –  1:6 (0:0, 0:2, 1:4)

27. February 1971 – Rotterdam

 –  1:18 (0:7, 0:7, 1:4)

27. February 1971 – Utrecht

 –  7:6 (3:1, 1:2, 3:3)

27. February 1971 – Tilburg

 –  0:7 (0:4, 0:1, 0:2)

27. February 1971 – Geleen

 –  2:1 (0:1, 0:0, 2:0)

1 March 1971 – Tilburg

 –  3:3 (3:1, 0:0, 0:2)

1 March 1971 – Eindhoven

 –  21:1 (8:0, 5:0, 8:1)

1 March 1971 – Rotterdam

 –  4:7 (0:3, 3:1, 1:3)

1 March 1971 – s-Hertogenbosch

 –  5:4 (1:2, 3:2, 1:0)

2 March 1971 – Nijmegen

 –  4:8 (2:3, 0:2, 2:3)

2 March 1971 – Rotterdam

 –  2:12 (1:2, 1:6, 0:4)

2 March 1971 – Utrecht

 –  18:0 (5:0, 8:0, 5:0)

2 March 1971 – Eindhoven

 –  6:4 (0:1, 4:3, 2:0)

4 March 1971 – Groningen

 –  5:4 (0:2, 3:1, 2:1)

4 March 1971 – Heerenveen

 –  31:1 (9:1, 9:0, 13:0)

4 March 1971 – s-Hertogenbosch

 –  2:10 (2:4, 0:5, 0:1)

4 March 1971 – Tilburg

 –  5:5 (2:1, 1:2, 2:2)

5 March 1971 – Heerenveen

 –  21:0 (7:0, 7:0, 7:0)

5 March 1971 – Tilburg

 –  1:5 (0:3, 0:1, 1:1)

5 March 1971 – Groningen

 –  3:4 (0:1, 1:1, 2:2)

5 March 1971 – Rotterdam

 –  11:1 (4:0, 4:0, 4:1)

7 March 1971 – Rotterdam

 –  0:2 (0:1, 0:0, 0:1)

7 March 1971 – Eindhoven

 –  11:2 (3:0, 4:1, 4:1)

7 March 1971 – Geleen

 –  2:9 (1:4, 0:3, 1:2)

7 March 1971 – Utrecht

Ranking and statistics

Tournament Awards
Best players selected by the directorate:
Best Goaltender:       Jiří Holeček
Best Defenceman:       Jan Suchý
Best Forward:          Anatoli Firsov
Media All-Star Team:
Goaltender:  Jiří Holeček
Defence:  Ilpo Koskela,  Jan Suchý
Forwards:  Anatoli Firsov,  Alexander Maltsev,  Vladimir Vikulov

Final standings
The final standings of the tournament according to IIHF:

European championships final standings
The final standings of the European championships according to IIHF:

Notes

References
Summary (in french)

 

IIHF Men's World Ice Hockey Championships
World Championships
International ice hockey competitions hosted by Switzerland
March 1971 sports events in Europe
April 1971 sports events in Europe
20th century in Geneva
20th century in Bern
Sports competitions in Bern
Sports competitions in Geneva
February 1971 sports events in Europe
La Chaux-de-Fonds
World Championships
International ice hockey competitions hosted by the Netherlands